A gulf in geography is a large bay that is an arm of an ocean or sea.  Not all geological features which could be considered a gulf have "Gulf" in the name, for example the Bay of Bengal or Arabian Sea.

List
The term may refer to:
Gulf of Aden, off the southwestern corner of the Arabian Peninsula
Gulf of Alaska, in the Pacific Ocean, south of the state of Alaska
Albay Gulf, in the southern part of Luzon, Philippines
Ambracian Gulf, of the Ionian Sea in northwestern Greece
Amundsen Gulf, in the Arctic Ocean, northwest of Canada
Gulf of Aqaba, in the northern end of the Red Sea
Argolic Gulf, of the Aegean Sea off the east coast of the Peloponnese, Greece
Asid Gulf, in the municipality of Milagros, Masbate, Philippines
Gulf of Bahrain, inlet of the Persian Gulf on the east coast of Saudi Arabia
Gulf of Boothia, in Nunavut, Canada
Gulf of Bothnia, part of the Baltic Sea between Sweden and Finland
Gulf of Burgas, Black Sea, Bulgaria
Gulf of Cádiz, part of the Atlantic Ocean off the southern border of Spain and Portugal
Gulf of California, in the Pacific Ocean in northwestern Mexico
Cambridge Gulf, on the north coast of Western Australia
Gulf of Carpentaria, in Northern Australia
Gulf of Cazones, in southern Cuba
Gulf of Corinth, of the Ionian Sea separating the Peloponnese from western mainland Greece
Gulf of Corryvreckan, off the west coast of mainland Scotland
Davao Gulf, in Davao City, Mindanao, the Philippines
Exmouth Gulf, gulf in North West Australia
 Gulf of the Farallones, between the Farallon Islands and the mainland coast of California, United States
Gulf of Finland, between the southern coast of Finland and the northern coast of Estonia in the Baltic Sea
Gulf of Fonseca, of the Pacific Ocean in El Salvador, Honduras, and Nicaragua
Gulf of Gabès, gulf on Tunisia's east coast in the Mediterranean Sea, off North Africa
Gulf of Genoa, inside the Ligurian Sea on the northwestern coast of Italy
Gulf of Gonâve, in the Caribbean Sea off the coast of Haiti
Gulf of Guinea, in the Atlantic Ocean off the coast of Equatorial Africa
Gulf of Hammamet, in northeastern Tunisia

 Hauraki Gulf, of the North Island of New Zealand
 Gulf of Honduras in the Caribbean Sea between Belize, Guatemala, and Honduras

Gulf Islands close to Vancouver Island and within the Strait of Georgia within British Columbia
Gulf of İzmir in the Aegean Sea between Turkey and Greece
Gulf of Khambhat in the Arabian Sea, formerly known as the Gulf of Cambay
Gulf of Kuşadası
Gulf of Kutch in the Arabian Sea
Lagonoy Gulf in the Philippines
Leyte Gulf, in Eastern Visayas, Philippines
Lingayen Gulf, off western Luzon, the Philippines, in the South China Sea
Gulf of Lion, a bay on the Mediterranean coastline of Languedoc-Roussillon and Provence in France
Gulf of Maine, off the States of Maine, New Hampshire, and Massachusetts in the United States, and the Canadian Provinces of New Brunswick, and Nova Scotia in the Atlantic Ocean
Malian Gulf
Gulf of Mannar, between India and Sri Lanka
Gulf of Mexico, between Mexico, the United States, and Cuba
Gulf of Morbihan, a natural harbor on the coast of the Département of Morbihan in the south of Brittany
Gulf of Nicoya, in Costa Rica. Central America. 
Gulf of Odessa 
Gulf of Oman, between the southeastern Arabian Peninsula, Iran, Pakistan and Arabian Sea.
Gulf of Oristano, near Oristano on the Western Sardinian coast
Gulf of Panama in the Pacific Ocean south of Panama
Panay Gulf, in the Western Visayas, Philippines
Gulf of Paria, in the Caribbean Sea between Trinidad and Tobago and Venezuela
Persian Gulf between Iran and the Arabian Peninsula
Peter the Great Gulf in the Sea of Japan
Ragay Gulf in the Philippines
Gulf of Riga in the Baltic Sea
Gulf of Roses, the most northeastern bay on the Catalan coast
Gulf of Saint Lawrence, the world's largest estuary and the outlet of the Saint Lawrence River into the Atlantic Ocean
Gulf St Vincent, Separated from Spencer Gulf by the Yorke Peninsula
Saronic Gulf, which extends into Greece from the Aegean Sea.
Gulf of Sirte, just north of Libya in the Mediterranean
Spencer Gulf, near Port Lincoln, South Australia
Gulf of Suez in the northern end of the Red Sea, leading to the Suez Canal
Gulf of Taranto in the Mediterranean between the toe and the heel of Italy
Gulf of Tartary between Russia and Sakhalin
Gulf of Thailand just south of Thailand in the Pacific Ocean South China Seas
Gulf of Tonkin just east of North Vietnam in the Pacific Ocean
Gulf of Tunis in the Mediterranean off the coast of Tunisia
Gulf of Varna, Black Sea, Bulgaria
Gulf of Venice, at the head of the Adriatic Sea between Italy, Slovenia and Croatia
Moro Gulf, the largest gulf in the Philippines off the coast of Mindanao

References

External links 
 

Gulfs
Gulf
 Gulfs